Johan Hagbart Pedersen Grøttumsbraaten (24 February 1899 – 24 January 1983) was a Norwegian skier who competed in Nordic combined and cross-country. Dominating both events in the 1920s and early 1930s, he won several medals in the early Winter Olympics. Most notably, he won two gold medals at the 1928 Winter Olympics, and as one of the only two entrants to win two gold medalists from St. Moritz, was the most successful athlete there, along with Clas Thunberg of Finland. He previously won three medals (one silver, two bronzes) at the inaugural Winter Olympics held in Chamonix in 1924, and went on to defend his Olympic title in Nordic Combined Skiing at the 1932 Winter Olympics.

In addition, he won three gold medals at the FIS Nordic World Ski Championships: In 1931 he won both the cross-country 18 km and Nordic combined, after winning the Nordic combined event earlier in 1926.

Grøttumsbråten is one of only four people to ever win the Holmenkollen ski festival's Nordic combined event five times (1923, 1926, 1928, 1929 and 1931). In 1924, he shared the Holmenkollen medal with fellow Norwegian Nordic combined athlete Harald Økern.

Cross-country skiing results
All results are sourced from the International Ski Federation (FIS).

Olympic Games
 3 medals – (1 gold, 1 silver, 1 bronze)

World Championships
 1 medal – (1 gold)

References

Further reading

External links

  (cross-country)
  (Nordic combined)
 Holmenkollen medalists – click Holmenkollmedaljen for downloadable pdf file 
 Holmenkollen winners since 1892 – click Vinnere for downloadable pdf file 

1899 births
1983 deaths
Norwegian male cross-country skiers
Olympic cross-country skiers of Norway
Cross-country skiers at the 1924 Winter Olympics
Cross-country skiers at the 1928 Winter Olympics
Cross-country skiers at the 1932 Winter Olympics
Holmenkollen medalists
Holmenkollen Ski Festival winners
Nordic combined skiers at the 1924 Winter Olympics
Nordic combined skiers at the 1928 Winter Olympics
Nordic combined skiers at the 1932 Winter Olympics
Norwegian male Nordic combined skiers
Olympic Nordic combined skiers of Norway
Olympic gold medalists for Norway
Olympic silver medalists for Norway
Olympic bronze medalists for Norway
Olympic medalists in cross-country skiing
Olympic medalists in Nordic combined
FIS Nordic World Ski Championships medalists in cross-country skiing
FIS Nordic World Ski Championships medalists in Nordic combined
Medalists at the 1924 Winter Olympics
Medalists at the 1928 Winter Olympics
Medalists at the 1932 Winter Olympics